Ma’had atTarbiyah al-Islamiyah, commonly known as MATRI is the only private religious school in Perlis. Founded in 1987 by the late Dato' Kaya Bakti Ustaz Dahlan Mohd. Zain, MATRI celebrated its two decades of existence in May 2008 with the visit of over 10,000 visitors from all over Malaysia.

MATRI is located in Tunjung Village, Beseri, Perlis in Malaysia. Situated nearby a rubber plantation, MATRI is surrounded by greenery, with mountains as a background. This 16.2-hectare-school is accessible by road 14 kilometres from Kangar, the capital of Perlis. In 2008 there were 817 students in 34 classes.

History 
The school was founded on 2 August 1987 with eight boys and nine girls, at the earlier stage of Marhalah Khassah (Pre-University). Currently, administered by Al-Fadhil Ustaz Omar Haji Salleh with his committees, the classes are run from 7.30a.m. till 4.00p.m. Entry to MATRI is based on availability and permission from the school’s Administration Body.

The houses
There are five houses in MATRI, each with their Housemaster and house colour and mascot. Scores for each house are gained through competitions. At the end of the year, the best house will be announced and rewarded by the headmaster. The five competitive houses are:
 Yarmouk House
 Badar House
 Uhud House
 Qadisiyyah House
 Khaibar House

External links
 MATRI website
 MATRI Perlis alumni links

Private schools in Malaysia
Schools in Perlis